The 1923 Oregon Webfoots football team represented the University of Oregon in the Pacific Coast Conference (PCC) during the 1923 college football season.  In their sixth and final season under head coach Charles A. Huntington, the Webfoots compiled a 3–4–1 record (0–4–1 against PCC opponents), finished in last place in the PCC, and outscored their opponents, 113 to 66. The team played its home games at Hayward Field in Eugene, Oregon.

Schedule

References

Oregon
Oregon Ducks football seasons
Oregon Ducks football